The Best American Poetry 1994, a volume in The Best American Poetry series, was edited by David Lehman and by guest editor A. R. Ammons.

Poets and poems included

See also
 1994 in poetry

Notes

External links
 Web page for contents of the book, with links to each publication where the poems originally appeared

Best American Poetry series
1994 poetry books
American poetry anthologies